Glendon is a borough in Northampton County, Pennsylvania. The population of Glendon was 373 at the 2020 census. Glendon is part of the Lehigh Valley metropolitan area, which had a population of 861,899 and was thus the 68th most populous metropolitan area in the U.S. as of the 2020 census.

Geography
Glendon is located at  (40.662152, -75.235758).

Transportation

Interstate 78 is the only numbered highway passing through Glendon, following a southwest-northeast alignment through the length of the borough. However, the nearest exit is in neighboring Williams Township. Main thoroughfares within the borough include Island Park Road, Main Street and 25th Street.

Demographics

As of the census of 2000, there were 367 people, 139 households, and 98 families residing in the borough. The population density was 573.7 people per square mile (221.4/km2). There were 150 housing units at an average density of 234.5 per square mile (90.5/km2). The racial makeup of the borough was 95.64% White, 0.82% African American, 1.36% Asian, 0.27% from other races, and 1.91% from two or more races. Hispanic or Latino of any race were 2.18% of the population.

There were 139 households, out of which 33.1% had children under the age of 18 living with them, 58.3% were married couples living together, 7.9% had a female householder with no husband present, and 28.8% were non-families. 23.0% of all households were made up of individuals, and 16.5% had someone living alone who was 65 years of age or older. The average household size was 2.64 and the average family size was 3.15.

In the borough, the population was spread out, with 28.9% under the age of 18, 4.4% from 18 to 24, 30.2% from 25 to 44, 23.4% from 45 to 64, and 13.1% who were 65 years of age or older. The median age was 36 years. For every 100 females there were 109.7 males. For every 100 females age 18 and over, there were 107.1 males.

The median income for a household in the borough was $42,969, and the median income for a family was $45,417. Males had a median income of $37,813 versus $33,375 for females. The per capita income for the borough was $17,593. About 12.9% of families and 15.4% of the population were below the poverty line, including 28.4% of those under age 18 and 9.1% of those age 65 or over.

Public education
The borough is served by the Wilson Area School District. Students in grades nine through 12 attend Wilson Area High School in the district.

Gallery

References

External links

1843 establishments in Pennsylvania
Boroughs in Northampton County, Pennsylvania
Boroughs in Pennsylvania
Populated places established in 1843